Malagueño is the name of:

Atlético Malagueño, Spanish football club
Franco Malagueño, Argentine footballer
Javier Malagueño, Argentine footballer